Phrae Airport  is an airport serving Phrae, a town in the Phrae Province of Thailand.

History 
Phrae Airport was built during World War 2 with a gravel runway. After the war ended, the airport operator was given to Royal Thai Air Force for them to maintain. Then, Phrae Airport was developed by Department of Commercial Aviation (Thailand) in 1952 for passenger and airmail uses by upgrading the runway to be 30 x 1,200 meters and building a terminal.

In 1971 - 1973 Department of Civil Aviation (Thailand) upgraded the runway, taxiway, and tarmac's material to be asphalt concrete, and extending the runway again to be 1,500 meters long. In 1974 - 1975, the current terminal was built, and was expanded in 1981 - 1982 to 250 square meters. The terminal was expanded again in 1990 to 432 square meters, and installed air conditioners. Then, a new 7-floor air traffic control tower was built to separate it from the terminal in 1996.

Facilities

Terminal 
Phrae Airport's terminal is 3 storeys tall, but only one floor is used. The building space is 1,400 square meters, which can accommodate up to 374 people per hour.
 Floor 1: departures and arrivals area, and airport's office.
 Floor 2 and 3: previously used for air traffic control.

Tarmac size is 60 by 180 meters, which can accommodate up to three ATR 72s at the same time. There are also six helicopter landing pads.

Airlines and destinations

Statistics

Traffic numbers

References

External links
Phrae Airport, Dept of Civil Aviation

Airports in Thailand
Phrae province
Airports established in 1952